Kraton or keraton is a type of royal palace in Java, Indonesia. Its name is derived from the Javanese ka-ratu-an, meaning residence of the ratu, the traditional honorific title for a monarch. In Java, the palace of a prince is called pura or dalem, while the general word for palace is istana, identical to Malay.

Specific palaces

Kraton that function as the residence of a royal family include:
Yogyakarta (Jogja) region
Kraton Ngayogyakarta Hadiningrat (Palace of Sultan Hamengkubuwono).
Pura Pakualaman (Palace of Adipati Pakualam).

Surakarta (Solo) region 
Kraton Surakarta Hadiningrat (Palace of Susuhunan Pakubuwono).
Pura Mangkunegaran (Palace of Adipati Mangkunegara).

Cirebon area
Kraton Kasepuhan (Palace of Sultan Sepuh).
Kraton Kanoman (Palace of Sultan Anom).
Kraton Kacirebonan (Palace of Sultan Cirebon).
Kraton Kaprabonan (id) (Palace of Sultan Prabon).

Historical palaces
The locations of former kraton have been determined by historical records or archaeological efforts. Former kraton include:

Kraton Ratu Boko, east of Yogyakarta in the Prambanan area. The structure dates from 9th century and is thought to belong to the Sailendra or Mataram Kingdom, however local inhabitants named this site after King Boko, the legendary king in Loro Jongrang folklore.
Kraton of Majapahit in Trowulan, Mojokerto, the capital of the former Majapahit. Sites such as Pendopo Agung Majapahit are thought to be remnants of the Kraton of Majapahit.

In Banten region there are remnants of the Sultanate of Banten's palaces:
Kraton Surosowan, Banten, former royal palace of Sultanate of Banten.
Kraton Kaibon, the former palace of queen mother.

In Surakarta and Yogyakarta region, there is the remnants of Sultanate of Mataram palaces:
Kota Gede remains of a palace from the 16th century.
Karta and Plered, there are remains of palaces from the 17th century.
Kraton Kartasura on the outskirt of Surakarta, remains of palace and city wall, also dated from 17th century.

Metonymic use
The term kraton 'palace' is also used as a way to refer to the court which it houses.

This is especially the case for native Indonesian states where the succession is disputed, giving issue to two or more branches of the dynasty, or even rivaling dynasties, each setting up an alternative court, while competing for the same state, but generally only controlling part of it.

An example is the West-Javan state of Cirebon, which was founded in 1478 and since 1662 was ruled from three Kraton (palaces):
 Kraton Kasepuhan, using as the ruler's style Sultan
 Kraton Kanoman, style Sultan
 Kraton Kacirebonan, style Sultan

See also

List of palaces
Istana
Cirebon
Yogyakarta
Surakarta
Crown jewels for current palaces outside of Java but in Indonesia
List of Indonesian monarchies
Palaces

Notes

References
 Miksic, John N. (general ed.), et al. (2006)  Karaton Surakarta. A look into the court of Surakarta Hadiningrat, central Java (First published: 'By the will of His Serene Highness Paku Buwono XII'. Surakarta: Yayasan Pawiyatan Kabudayan Karaton Surakarta, 2004)  Marshall Cavendish Editions  Singapore

External links
WorldSatesmen - Indonesia - Princely States

Indonesian words and phrases
Royal residences in Indonesia